Jaswinder Singh Dhami (born 1 March 1989), better known as Jaz Dhami, is a British-Indian playback singer, music composer, music producer, and performer.

Early life
Jaz Dhami is a native of Sandhra Sodhia in the Hoshiarpur district and is of Punjabi, Indian origin. He was raised in Birmingham, Handsworth. He follows Sikhism. He is the son of Bikramjit Dhami, lead vocalist of the Bhangra band Sangam. From the age of nine Jaz's vocal abilities were recognized by his father. At the age of 9, Jaz began on his musical journey, undertaking tutorials in Indian classical training in Birmingham, England.

Community work

Jaz Dhami is involved in encouraging Asians to get into football and is featured in The Football Association's "Football Needs" campaign.

Discography

Albums
 2008: Groundshaker 2 (featured by Aman Hayer)
 2009: JD
 2012: Jakara (Music: Gurmeet Singh)
 2018: Pieces Of Me

Singles
 2008: Roj Miliye
 2009: Theke Wali
 2009: Tera Mera
 2010: Bari Der
 2011: Tere Naal
 2012: Sardari (Jakara & Music by Gurmeet Singh)
 2012: High Heels ft. Yo Yo Honey Singh
 2013: Meh Punjabi Boli Ah
 2013: Zulfa ft. Dr Zeus
 2014: Zulfa Reprise ft. Dr Zeus
 2014: "God Only Knows" (BBC Music) featuring Stevie Wonder, Pharrell Williams, Emeli Sande, Elton John, Kylie Minogue, One Direction, Sam Smith, Chris Martin, Brian Wilson, Eliza Carthy, Nicola Benedetti, Jools Holland, Brian May, Jake Bugg, Katie Derham, Lauren Laverne, Gareth Malone, Alison Balsom, Zane Lowe, Paloma Faith, Chrissie Hynde, Jamie Cullum, Baaba Maal, Danielle de Niese, Dave Grohl
 2014: Pasina ft Sneakbo & Ikka [Steel Banglez]
 2015: Beparwaiyan
 2015: Beparwaiyan Refix ft. Dr Zeus & Fateh
 2015: Sithneyan ft. Aman Hayer
 2015: Sitarey Tigerstyle ft. Jaz Dhami
 2015: Munda Like Me
 2016: Bhangra Machine ft. PBN
 2016: Teri Ah
 2017: Desi Girls Do It Better  with Raool
 2017: Oye Hoye Oye Hoye
 2017: Oye Hoye Oye Hoye (Desi Mix)
 2017 : Jean Teri featuring Raftaar (rapper), Deep Kalsi
 2017 : Kurti Mal Mal di featuring Kanika Kapoor, Tigerstyle, Shortie Littlelox
 2018 : So Simple
 2018 : Shehzada
 2018 : Cyclone
 2022 : Bas ft. Karan Aujla (music by Yeah Proof)

Bollywood

Awards
 Best Newcomer 2009  – UK Asian Music Awards
 Best Male Act 2010 – Brit Asia TV Music Awards
 Best Desi Act 2011 – UK Asian Music Awards
 Best song of 2012 –  PTC Awards (Punjabi Television Awards)
 Best Male Act 2013 – Brit Asia TV Music Awards
 Best Single 2014 for "Zulfa" – Brit Asia TV Music Awards
 Best Bollywood Song 2016 – PTC Awards (Punjabi Television Awards)

References

External links
 

Bhangra (music) musicians
1986 births
Living people
Alumni of the Liverpool Institute for Performing Arts